Marnes is the name or part of the name of three communes of France:
Marnes, Deux-Sèvres in the Deux-Sèvres département
Marnes-la-Coquette in the Hauts-de-Seine département
Saint-Jouin-de-Marnes in the Deux-Sèvres département